Port Williams is an unincorporated community in Atchison County, Kansas, United States.

History
Port Williams was located on the Missouri Pacific Railroad. Port Williams, or Port William, had a post office from 1856 until 1860.

References

Further reading

External links
 Atchison County maps: Current, Historic, KDOT

Unincorporated communities in Atchison County, Kansas
Unincorporated communities in Kansas
1856 establishments in Kansas Territory